Paparangi, one of the northern suburbs of Wellington in New Zealand, lies approximately 10 km north of the city centre, north-east of Johnsonville, north-west of Newlands and south of Grenada and Woodridge. The population was 2,841 , an increase of 96 from the 2006 census population.

The New Zealand Ministry for Culture and Heritage gives a translation of "flat sky" for the Maori-language name Paparangi.

The suburb has a small local shopping-centre and a low-decile primary school.

The area, formerly in small farms and part of Newlands, became a dormitory suburb of Wellington, with major subdivisions in the early 1960s adding about a hundred houses a year. Beazley Homes of Tauranga (owned by Barry Beazley) was a major developer.

Some of the street names are the first names of children living in the area then or of children whose parents became involved in development of the suburb (Cara Crescent, Mark Avenue and Lynda Avenue take their names from children of Barry Beazley).

In 1991 a new landfill opened in Grenada, with direct access via an overbridge to the adjacent motorway. A road extension would give Newlands and Paparangi access to the motorway, but the Grenada Village Progressive Association expressed concerns about any increase in traffic and in car speeds. From 1994 the Wellington City Council consulted with residents, and in 2009 the Mayor opened the "Mark Avenue Extension" connecting the two areas.

History 
The area was settled by a farmer Thomas Drake from Devonshire who was a descendant of John Drake, brother to Sir Francis Drake. He obtained a Crown Grant of 332 acres of land in 1861. His widow Ceres Selina Drake sold the land to the Crown on 3 August 1897, and it was broken into small farms of the Paparangi Estate, as one of the Small Farms Settlements of Richard Seddon’s Liberal Government. Working men got a 2 hectare (5 acre) lease-in-perpetuity section on which they could grow fruit and vegetables and keep pigs, bees and fowls.

In the 1920s and 1930s there were five dairy farms in Newlands and Paparangi, supplying town milk to Wellington. Sam Styles had a 90-acre (36 ha) dairy farm, Ocean View Farm in Horokiwi Road, Paparangi supplying milk and cream. He was a Makara County Councillor, and later ran 200 sheep on 200 acres (80 ha) at the top of Horokiwi. The farm was sold to Mr McKinley after Styles' death in 1935.

Demographics 

Paparangi had a population of 2,874 at the 2018 New Zealand census, an increase of 135 people (4.9%) since the 2013 census, and an increase of 210 people (7.9%) since the 2006 census. There were 1,029 households. There were 1,404 males and 1,467 females, giving a sex ratio of 0.96 males per female. The median age was 35.5 years (compared with 37.4 years nationally), with 612 people (21.3%) aged under 15 years, 540 (18.8%) aged 15 to 29, 1,377 (47.9%) aged 30 to 64, and 342 (11.9%) aged 65 or older.

Ethnicities were 63.4% European/Pākehā, 10.2% Māori, 6.3% Pacific peoples, 27.6% Asian, and 3.5% other ethnicities (totals add to more than 100% since people could identify with multiple ethnicities).

The proportion of people born overseas was 34.2%, compared with 27.1% nationally.

Although some people objected to giving their religion, 46.6% had no religion, 35.3% were Christian, 4.5% were Hindu, 3.2% were Muslim, 2.6% were Buddhist and 3.3% had other religions.

Of those at least 15 years old, 741 (32.8%) people had a bachelor or higher degree, and 240 (10.6%) people had no formal qualifications. The median income was $39,500, compared with $31,800 nationally. The employment status of those at least 15 was that 1,275 (56.4%) people were employed full-time, 300 (13.3%) were part-time, and 96 (4.2%) were unemployed.

Education

References 

Suburbs of Wellington City